Pat Jones may refer to:

 Pat Jones (American football) (born 1947), American football player and coach
 Pat Jones (footballer, born 1920) (1920–1990), English footballer
 Patricia W. Jones (born 1950), American politician
 Pat Jones (hurdler), British hurdler and 1968 Olympian
 Pat Jones (footballer, born 2003), Welsh footballer

See also
 Patrick Jones (disambiguation)
 Patricia Jones (disambiguation)